W711-2 was a baseball card set of 35 total unnumbered, black and white cards measuring " × " released in 1940. The complete set was issued by the Cincinnati Reds baseball club, and sold at the ballpark. 29 cards feature a player's portrait photo on the front while name, position and biographical information and five years worth of statistics are on the back.

Overview
This set was part of the 711 series, consisting of several collection issued by the Reds from 1939 to 1956. The 711-2 collection is also commonly known as the '1940 Cincinnati Reds Team Issue' instead of Jefferson Burdick's The American Card Catalog reference number. The balance of the 6 cards were reference cards describing the World Series win in 1940 against the Detroit Tigers and an order form in which to get more of these sets from Harry Hartman Publishing Co. in Cincinnati, Ohio.

This set had few known baseball stars on the team with the exception of Johnny Vandermeer who still holds the record for two consecutive no-hitter games in 1938, Eddie Joost and Ernie Lombardi. A complete list of players in this set are shown below.

Player/card list 

 Morrie Arnovich 
 William (Bill) Baker  
 Joe Beggs 
 Harry Craft 
 Paul Derringer 
 Lonny Frey 
 Ival Goodman 
 Harry (Hank) Gowdy 
 Witt Guise 
 Harry (Socko) Hartman 
 Willard Hershberger 
 John Hutchings
 Eddie Joost  
 Ernie Lombardi 
 Frank McCormick 
 Myron McCormick
 William Boyd McKechnie 
 Lloyd (Whitey) Moore 
 William (Bill) Meyers 
 Lewis Riggs
 Elmer Riddle 
 James A. Ripple 
 Milt Shoffner 
 Eugene Thompson 
 James Turner 
 Johnny Vandermeer 
 Bucky Walters 
 William Werber 
 James Wilson 
 The Cincinnati Reds 
 The Cincinnati Reds World Champions 
 Tell the World About the Cincinnati Reds  
 Tell the World About the Cincinnati Reds World Champions  
 Results 1940 World Series 
 Debt of Gratitude to Wm. Koeh Co.

References

Baseball cards